Mahseya is a moshav in central Israel. Located about 2 kilometers east of Beit Shemesh, it falls under the jurisdiction of Mateh Yehuda Regional Council in the Jerusalem District.

History
The village was established in 1950 by Jewish immigrants and refugees from Morocco and from Yemen and Aden, on the land of depopulated Palestinian Arab village of Dayr Aban. Although it too was later abandoned, it was re-settled by Cochin Jews. Its name is taken from Jeremiah 32:12;
And I delivered the deed of the purchase unto Baruch the son of Neriah, the son of Mahseiah, in the presence of Hanamel mine uncle['s son], and in the presence of the witnesses that subscribed the deed of the purchase, before all the Jews that sat in the court of the guard.

During the 1948 Arab–Israeli War, to the south of the current site of the moshav, there was located a military outpost for the Egyptian army (within the Arab village, Dayr Aban), known as the 'Joint' Command Post, and which place was taken in armed conflict during Operation Ha-Har.

Archaeology
In 2004, archaeologists uncovered a large stone building, 40 × 80 m, with  floors composed of chalk, stone and mosaic. An olive press was built to the west. Pottery vessels and coins date the building to the sixth–eighth centuries CE. From the size and nature of construction, it is believed to have been a monastery.

References

Moshavim
Populated places established in 1950
Populated places in Jerusalem District
1950 establishments in Israel
Moroccan-Jewish culture in Israel
Yemeni-Jewish culture in Israel